SDE Hockey are a Swedish ice hockey club in the Swedish Women's Hockey League (SDHL). They play in the Enebyberg area of Danderyd Municipality in Metropolitan Stockholm at Enebybergs Ishall.

History 
The club was formed in 2007 from the merger of the ice hockey sections of Stocksunds IF, Danderyds SK, and Enebybergs IF, the initials of which form the club's name.

The club first earned promotion to the SDHL in 2014. They have stayed in the league since, although were forced to play in the relegation series in each of their first five SDHL seasons. They made the quarter-finals for the first time in 2019–20 season.

Season-by-season results 
This is a partial list of the last six seasons completed by SDE Hockey. Note that the SDHL was known as Riksserien until 2016.Note: Finish = Rank at end of regular season; GP = Games played, W = Wins (3 points), OTW = Overtime wins (2 points), OTL = Overtime losses (1 point), L = Losses, GF = Goals for, GA = Goals against, Pts = Points, Top scorer: Points (Goals+Assists)

Players and personnel

2021–22 roster 

Coaching and team personnel
 Head coach: Johanna Ikonen
 Assistant coach: Jan Bylesjö
 Assistant coach: Amy Young
 Goaltending coach: Ola Kahem
 Equipment manager: Camilla Henriksson Bajas

Team captaincy history 
 Frida Ekdahl, 2013–14
 Linn Hansén, 2014–15
 Hanna Blomqvist, 2016–17
 Leanne Ganney, 2018–2021
 Michelle Löwenhielm, 2021–

Head coaches 
 Jonas Möller, –2015
 Erik Lektorp, 2015–16
 Maggie Litchfield Medd, 2016–2018
 Shane Warschaw, 2018–2020
 Dominique Di Rocco, 2020–21
 Johanna Ikonen, 2021–22
 Jan Bylesjö, 2022–

Notable alumnae   
Seasons played with SDE listed alongside player name.
 Amanda Helgöstam, 2012–2016
 Emilie O'Konor, 2012–2015
 Danijela Rundqvist, 2013–14
 Lovisa Selander, 2012–2015
 Hanna Åström, 2016–2019

International players 
Flag indicates nation of primary IIHF eligibility.

  Kelty Apperson, 2019–2021
  Zoe Barbier, 2014–2016
  Nóra Brgles, 2014–2018
  Amy Budde, 2019–2021
  Katie Henry, 2014–15
  Petra Herzigová, 2015–16
  Mieneke de Jong, 2016–17
  Chloë Keijzer, 2014–15
  Karolína Kovářová, 2018–19
  Linnea Holterud Olsson, 2015–16
  Lucie Manhartová, 2015–16
  Lisa Mattsson, 2018–19
  Klára Peslarová, 2015–2017
  Jacquie Pierri, 2019–2021
  Hanna Pintér, 2020–21
  Lili Pintér, 2015–2021
  Pia Pren, 2019–20
  Phoebe Stänz, 2017–18
  Helmi Teivaala, 2016–2018
  Nadine Ullrich, 2013–14
  Savine Wielenga, 2019–2021

References

External links 
 

Ice hockey teams in Sweden
Sport in Stockholm
Swedish Women's Hockey League teams
Women's ice hockey teams in Europe
Women's ice hockey in Sweden
Ice hockey teams in Stockholm County